Maureen Cecilia Clarke Clarke (born 22 November 1952) is a Costa Rican attorney and women's rights leader. She was president of the Inter-American Commission of Women (CIM; 2013–2015).

Biography
Clarke was born in Limón in 1952. She attended Elementary Esmeralda Jimenez Oreamuno until 1965, Secondary Liceo Luis Dobles Segreda until 1971, and graduated from the University of Costa Rica in 1977 with a Bachelor of Law.

Clarke worked for 16 years as a Legal Adviser to the Ministry of Agriculture, during which she advised on international agreements and investments in the agricultural sector.
She has served as Minister of Condición de la Mujer (2012–2013); First Deputy Mayor of San José (2003–2009); Minister of Justicia y Gracia (1995–1996); Minister of Gobernación y Policía (1994–1995); adviser in the Legislative Assembly (1999–2002), and as a coordinator with Red Centroamericana de Mujeres Rurales, Indígenas y Campesinas (RECMURIC). She has also served as the Executive President of the National Women's Institute and President of the Inter-American Commission of Women of the OAS.

References

1952 births
Living people
Costa Rican women's rights activists
Costa Rican women activists
People from Limón Province
20th-century Costa Rican lawyers
Costa Rican women lawyers
Government ministers of Costa Rica
University of Costa Rica alumni
Women government ministers of Costa Rica
Female justice ministers
21st-century Costa Rican women politicians